The 2018–19 FC Basel season is the 126th season in club history and the club's 24th consecutive season in the top flight of Swiss football. Basel were runners-up in the previous season. The season started on the weekend of 21–22 July 2018 and will end on Saturday 25 May 2019. The first round of the Swiss Cup was played on the week-end 29, 30 June and 1 July. Basel played the first round on Friday 29 June against lower classed FC Montlingen and they were victorious. Therefore Basel continued in the competition in the second round against FC Echallens.

Basel were also qualified for qualifying phase and play-offs (League Path). The draw for the second qualifying round was held on 19 June 2018 (after the completion of the first qualifying round draw). The first leg was played on 24 July and the second leg played on 1 August 2018. But Basel were eliminated by PAOK and they therefore continued in the Play-off round of the Europa League against Vitesse Arnhem.

Club

Management 
Raphaël Wicky was the first team manager at the start of the season. His assistant was Massimo Lombardo and a further member of the training staff was Werner Leuthard. Due to the very poor start into the season Wicky was sacked on 26 July, after the Champions League qualifying defeat against PAOK. Alexander Frei then took over as interim coach until a new manager was named. On 2 August Basel announced that Marcel Koller had signed as new manager. He appointed Thomas Janeschitz and Carlos Bernegger as his assistants. Massimo Colomba stayed as the Goalkeeper coach. Massimo Ceccaroni is head of the FCB Youth System.

Further information 

The FC Basel annual general meeting took place on 4 June 2018. The board of directors under president Bernhard Burgener with sportdirector Marco Streller, Peter von Büren, financial manager, Patrick Jost, marketing as well as Reto Baumgartner, Dominik Donzé and Benno Kaiser remained on the board. Roland Heri was voted onto the board as COO.

Overview

Offseason and preseason
Between the end of the 2017–18 FC Basel season and this season there were quite a few changes in the team squad. All three goalkeepers left the team. Tomáš Vaclík transferred to Sevilla, Mirko Salvi transferred to Grasshopper Club and Germano Vailati ended his active career. Furthermore, Mohamed Elyounoussi left the club and joined Southampton. Michael Lang also left the club and joined Borussia Mönchengladbach. Cedric Itten transferred to St. Gallen,

In the other direction Basel were not too busy on the transfer market. On 22 June 2018 Basel announced that they had signed goalkeeper Jonas Omlin from Luzern and on 26 June 2018 Basel announced that they had signed Aldo Kalulu from Lyon.

During the winter break, on 4 February 2019, the club announced that Edon Zhegrova had been signed in on loan for 18 months from Genk.

The Campaign

Domestic League
The season started on the weekend of 21–22 July 2018. Basel's priority aim for the new season was to win the league championship.

Domestic Cup
Basel's clear aim for the cup this season was to win the title. The first round was played on the week-end 29, 30 June and 1 July. Basel played their first-round game on Friday 29 June away from home against lower classed FC Montlingen. In the first round Basel beat Montlingen 3–0, in the second round Echallens Région 7–2 and in the round of 16 Winterthur 1–0. In the quarter finals Sion were defeated 4–2 after extra time and in the semi finals Zürich 3–1. All these games were played away from home. The final was held on the 19 May 2019 in the Stade de Suisse Wankdorf Bern against Thun. Albian Ajeti scored the first goal, Fabian Frei the second for Basel, then Dejan Sorgić netted a goal for Thun, but the end result was 2–1 for Basel. Basel's aim for this competition was therefore fulfilled.

Champions League
Basel entered into the this season's Champions League in the qualifying phase and play-offs (League Path). The draw for the second qualifying round was held on 19 June 2018 (after the completion of the first qualifying round draw). The first legs will be played on 24 and 25 July, and the second legs will be played on 31 July and 1 August 2018. Basel were matched against the greek team PAOK.

Players

First team squad 
The following is the list of the Basel first team squad. It also includes players that were in the squad the day the season started on 21 July 2018 but subsequently left the club after that date.

Transfers summer 2018

In

Out

Transfers winter break 2018

In

Results and fixtures 
Kickoff times are in CET.

Legend

Friendly matches

Preseason

Winter break

Swiss Super League

First half of season

Second half of season

League standings

Swiss Cup 

The draw for the first round was held in June 2018. The Super League and Challenge League clubs were seeded and could not be drawn against each other. The lower division teams were granted home advantage and Basel were therefore drawn away. The home advantage was also granted to the team from the lower league in the second and third rounds.

UEFA Champions League

Qualifying phase 

Basel were qualified for the 2018–19 UEFA Champions League in the qualifying phase (League Path) in the second qualifying round. The draw for this round was held on 19 June 2018.

UEFA Europa League

Third qualifying round 

Following their elimination in the UEFA Champions League qualifying phase, Basel were qualified for the Europa League third qualifying round.

Play-off round

Notes

See also
 History of FC Basel
 List of FC Basel players
 List of FC Basel seasons

References

Sources
 Die ersten 125 Jahre / 2018. Publisher: Josef Zindel im Friedrich Reinhardt Verlag, Basel. 
 Season 2018–19 at "Basler Fussballarchiv” homepage
 Switzerland 2018–19 at RSSSF

External links
 

Basel
Basel
FC Basel seasons
Basel